Luis Hebertson Moreira Ibarra (born September 23, 1978) is an Ecuadorian retired football midfielder. He has played for a number of clubs in Ecuador.

Honours

International
 
 Canada Cup: 1999

References

1978 births
Living people
People from Portoviejo
Association football forwards
Ecuadorian footballers
Ecuador international footballers
1999 Copa América players
C.S. Emelec footballers
C.D. Cuenca footballers
C.D. El Nacional footballers
Delfín S.C. footballers
L.D.U. Loja footballers
Deportivo Azogues footballers
S.D. Quito footballers